Jung-soo, also spelled Jeong-soo or Jong-su, is a Korean unisex given name. Its meaning differs based on the hanja used to write each syllable of the name.

Hanja
There are 75 hanja with the reading "jung" and 67 hanja with the reading "soo" on the South Korean government's official list of hanja which may be registered for use in given names. Ways of writing this name in hanja include:

 (바를 정 bareul jeong, 빼어날 수 bbaeeonal su): "upright and outstanding". These characters are also used to write the masculine Japanese given name Masahide.
 (곧을 정 godeul jeong, 빼어날 수 bbaeeonal su): "virtuous/chaste and outstanding"

According to South Korean government data, Jung-soo was the seventh-most popular name for newborn boys in 1945.

People
People with this name include:

Entertainers
Park Jung-soo (actress), (born 1953), South Korean actress
Yoon Jung-soo (born 1972), South Korean comedian
Han Jung-soo (born 1973), South Korean actor 
Byun Jung-soo (born 1974), South Korean actress 
Park Jeong-su (born 1983), stage name Leeteuk, South Korean singer, member of Super Junior

Sportspeople
Yun Jong-su (born 1962), North Korean football coach
Jung Jeong-soo (born 1969), South Korean football midfielder (K3 League)
Shim Jeong-soo (born 1975), South Korean baseball outfielder (Korea Baseball Organization)
Kim Jong-su (born 1977), North Korean sport shooter
Lee Jung-soo (born 1980), South Korean football centre-back (K-League Classic)
Park Jung-soo (footballer) (born 1987), South Korean football midfielder (K-League Challenge)
Lee Jung-su (born 1989), South Korean speed skater

See also
List of Korean given names

References

Korean unisex given names